The 1905–06 Brown Bears men's ice hockey season was the 9th season of play for the program. After the season the team was mothballed for 20 years

Season
For the first time Brown played games before the new year. Additionally, the team expanded its schedule to its largest extent in five years. Unfortunately, these changes weren't able to help pull the newly christened Bears out of their funk and the team lost every game for the second year in a row.

After the season, due to poor ice conditions, poor results in games and a lack of support, Brown suspended its ice hockey program. The team would remain dormant for 20 years.

Roster

Standings

Schedule and results

|-
!colspan=12 style=";" | Regular Season

† Yale records the score of the game as 7–3 Yale.

References

Brown Bears men's ice hockey seasons
Brown
Brown
Brown
Brown